"If the Devil Danced (In Empty Pockets)" is a song written by Ken Spooner and Kim Williams, and recorded by American country music singer Joe Diffie.  The song reached the top of the Billboard Hot Country Singles & Tracks (now Hot Country Songs) chart.  It was released in April 1991 as the third single from his debut album, A Thousand Winding Roads.

Music video
The music video was directed by Michael Salomon and premiered in early 1991.

Critical reception
Cashbox magazine published a positive review of the song, stating that it "focuses on a much lighter storyline, compared to previous releases. This cut humorously sheds a 'devil-made-me-do-it' theme swallowed up by a fun and bouncy tempo."

Chart performance
The song debuted at No. 47 on the Hot Country Singles & Tracks chart dated April 6, 1991. It charted for 20 weeks on that chart, and peaked at No. 1 on the country chart dated June 15, 1991, giving Diffie his second No. 1 single.

Charts

Year-end charts

References

1991 singles
Songs about dancing
Joe Diffie songs
Song recordings produced by Bob Montgomery (songwriter)
Epic Records singles
Music videos directed by Michael Salomon
Songs written by Kim Williams (songwriter)
1990 songs